Crispin James Garth Wright (born 21 December 1942) is a British philosopher, who has written on neo-Fregean (neo-logicist) philosophy of mathematics, Wittgenstein's later philosophy, and on issues related to truth, realism, cognitivism, skepticism, knowledge, and objectivity.  He is Professor of Philosophy at New York University and Professor of Philosophical Research at the University of Stirling, and taught previously at the University of St Andrews, University of Aberdeen, Princeton University and University of Michigan.

Life and career

Wright was born in Surrey and was educated at Birkenhead School (1950–61) and at Trinity College, Cambridge, graduating in Moral Sciences in 1964 and taking a PhD in 1968. He took an Oxford BPhil in 1969 and was elected Prize Fellow and then Research Fellow at All Souls College, Oxford, where he worked until 1978. He then moved to the University of St. Andrews, where he was appointed Professor of Logic and Metaphysics and then the first Bishop Wardlaw University Professorship in 1997. In fall 2008, he became professor in the Department of Philosophy at New York University (NYU). He has also taught at the University of Michigan, Oxford University, Columbia University, and Princeton University. Crispin Wright was founder and director of Arché at the University of St. Andrews, which he left in September 2009 to take up leadership of the Northern Institute of Philosophy (NIP) at the University of Aberdeen. Once NIP ceased operations in 2015, Wright moved to the University of Stirling. He is still professor at NYU.

Philosophical work

In the philosophy of mathematics, he is best known for his book Frege's Conception of Numbers as Objects (1983), where he argues that Frege's logicist project could be revived by removing the axiom schema of unrestricted comprehension (sometimes referred to as Basic Law V) from the formal system. Arithmetic is then derivable in second-order logic from Hume's principle.  He gives informal arguments that (i) Hume's principle plus second-order logic is consistent, and (ii) from it one can produce the Dedekind–Peano axioms. Both results were proven informally by Gottlob Frege (Frege's Theorem), and would later be more rigorously proven by George Boolos and Richard Heck. Wright is one of the major proponents of neo-logicism, alongside his frequent collaborator Bob Hale. He has also written Wittgenstein and the Foundations of Mathematics (1980).

In general metaphysics, his most important work is Truth and Objectivity (Harvard University Press, 1992). He argues in this book that there need be no single, discourse-invariant thing in which truth consists, making an analogy with identity. There need only be some principles regarding how the truth predicate can be applied to a sentence, some 'platitudes' about true sentences. Wright also argues that in some contexts, probably including moral contexts, superassertibility will effectively function as a truth predicate. He defines a predicate as superassertible if and only if it is "assertible" in some state of information and then remains so no matter how that state of information is enlarged upon or improved. Assertiveness is warrant by whatever standards inform the discourse in question. Many of his most important papers in philosophy of language, epistemology, philosophical logic, meta-ethics, and the interpretation of Wittgenstein have been collected in the two volumes published by Harvard University Press in 2001 and 2003.

In epistemology, Wright has argued that G. E. Moore's proof of an external world ("Here is one hand") is logically valid but cannot transmit warrant from its premise to the conclusion, as it instantiates a form of epistemic circularity called by him "warrant transmission failure". Wright has also developed a variant of Ludwig Wittgenstein's hinge epistemology, introduced in Wittgenstein's On Certainty as a response to radical skepticism. According to hinge epistemology, there are assumptions or presuppositions of any enquiry – called "hinge propositions" – that cannot themselves be rationally doubted, challenged, established or defended. Wright contends that certain hinge propositions can actually be rationally held because there exists a type of non-evidential, a priori warrant – which Wright calls "epistemic entitlement" – for accepting them as true.

Awards 
 Fellow of the American Academy of Arts and Sciences, 2012
 Leverhulme Trust Personal Research Professor, 1998–2003
 FRSE: Fellow of the Royal Society of Edinburgh, 1996
 FBA: Fellow of the British Academy, 1992
 British Academy Research Reader, 1990–2
 Fulbright scholar  at Princeton University, 1985-6
 Prize Fellow, All Souls College, Oxford, 1969–71

Books
Wittgenstein on the Foundations of Mathematics (Harvard University Press, 1980)
Frege's Conception of Numbers as Objects (Humanities Press 1983) 
Truth and Objectivity (Harvard University Press, 1992)
Realism, Meaning, and Truth, 2nd edition (Blackwell 1993)
The Reason's Proper Study (co-authored with Bob Hale) (Oxford University Press, 2001)
Rails to Infinity (Harvard University Press, 2001)
Saving the Differences (Harvard University Press, 2003).

References

External links
 
 
 
 
 
 

1942 births
20th-century British educators
20th-century British historians
20th-century British male writers
20th-century British mathematicians
20th-century British philosophers
20th-century educational theorists
20th-century essayists
21st-century British educators
21st-century British historians
21st-century British male writers
21st-century British mathematicians
21st-century British philosophers
21st-century educational theorists
21st-century essayists
Academics of the University of Aberdeen
Academics of the University of St Andrews
Alumni of All Souls College, Oxford
Alumni of Trinity College, Cambridge
Analytic philosophers
British educational theorists
British educators
British ethicists
British logicians
British male essayists
British male non-fiction writers
Epistemologists
Fellows of the American Academy of Arts and Sciences
Fellows of the British Academy
Fellows of the Royal Society of Edinburgh
British historians of mathematics
Historians of philosophy
Living people
Metaphilosophers
Metaphysicians
Metaphysics writers
New York University faculty
Ontologists
People associated with the University of Aberdeen
People educated at Birkenhead School
Philosophers of education
Philosophers of identity
Philosophers of language
Philosophers of linguistics
Philosophers of logic
Philosophers of mathematics
Philosophers of mind
Princeton University faculty
Semanticists
University of Michigan faculty
Academics of the University of Stirling
Wittgensteinian philosophers
Fulbright alumni